Firpo may refer to:

Surname
Luis Ángel Firpo, Argentine boxer
Kaz Firpo, American screenwriter
Roberto Firpo, Argentine tango pianist, composer and bandleader

Nickname
Young Firpo, American boxer in the US northwest in the 1920s and 1930s
Pampero Firpo, ring name of Argentinian/American wrestler Juan Kachmanian
Firpo Marberry, baseball player

See also 
C.D. Luis Ángel Firpo, a Salvadoran association football club